Southampton Football Club is an English association football club based in Southampton, Hampshire. Founded in 1885 as St Mary's YMA, they became a professional club in 1891 and co-founded the Southern Football League in 1894. Southampton won the Southern League Premier Division championship six times between 1896 and 1904, and were later elected to the Football League Third Division in 1920. The Saints finished as runners-up in their first Football League season, and the following year received promotion to the Second Division as Third Division South champions. The club first entered the First Division in 1966, and currently play in its modern-day counterpart, the Premier League. Southampton won the FA Cup in 1976, reached the final of the League Cup in 1979 and 2017, and won the League Trophy in 2010.

Since the club's formation, a total of 589 players have made fewer than 25 appearances for Southampton. Of these, 133 players have played only one game for the club, while 10 have made 24 appearances. Jack Dorkin, who played as a centre-forward for Southampton between 1893 and 1895, has scored the most goals of any player with fewer than 25 appearances for the club, with 20 in all competitions; seven more players have scored ten or more goals for the Saints. Four players scored in their only appearance for Southampton, including Jock Fleming who scored a hat-trick on his only game. Bob MacDonald scored four goals in four appearances for the Saints, while Norman Higham scored two in two for the club.

Key
The list is ordered first by date of debut, and then if necessary in alphabetical order by surname.
Appearances as a substitute are included. This feature of the game was introduced in the Football League at the start of the 1965–66 season.
Statistics are correct up to and including the match played on 18 March 2023. Where a player left the club permanently after this date, his statistics are updated to his date of leaving.

Players

Footnotes

References

External links
Southampton F.C. official website
Saints Players Archive

Southampton F.C.
Southampton-related lists
Association football player non-biographical articles